Gilvan District is in Tarom County, Zanjan province, Iran. At the 2006 National Census, the region's population (as Gilvan Rural District of the Central District) was 10,913 in 2,716 households. The following census in 2011 counted 11,360 people in 3,227 households. At the latest census in 2016, there were 10,830 inhabitants in 3,443 households. After the census, the rural district was elevated to the status of a county and divided into two rural districts and tne city of Gilvan.

References 

Tarom County

Districts of Zanjan Province

Populated places in Zanjan Province

Populated places in Tarom County

fa:بخش گیلوان